Although street performances similar to circuses have existed in India since ancient times, a circus similar to the one described by Philip Astley, known as the father of the modern circus, as described in 1770, only existed in India in the 1880s.

Birth of modern Indian circus 
In 1879, the Royal Italian Circus by Giuseppe Chiarini toured India. Before all his shows started, he would tell the audience that India did not have a proper circus and would have to wait many more years to develop one. In addition, he offered "a thousand British Indian rupees and a horse" as a gift to anyone who could repeat his daring stage effects within six months.

When his show was going on in Bombay, Balasahib Patwardhan, the king of the Kurundwad princely state of Sangli (today’s Kolhapur) also came watching it. Balasahib was accompanied by Vishnupant Chatre, the keeper of his stable and riding master at the stables. Chatre had some experience with teaching horses also. Accepting the challenge, Chatre announced that he will perform the same in Kurundwad within three months. Failing that, he promised Chiarini that he would return "ten thousand British Indian rupees and the top ten horses." On March 20, 1880, Chatre came to perform his circus at the Kurundwad Palace Grounds. But Chiarini, after his performance in Kolkata, who was worried about not even having the money to go back, did not come to see it.

Vishnupant Chatre bought most of the circus equipment from Chiarini. Within a year, he formed a new circus company called the Great Indian Circus. This is the first circus company in India. Chatre's Great Indian Circus toured various parts of India (including the same venue where the Chiarini's performance was held in Bombay) and other places including Sri Lanka, Singapore, Kuala Lumpur, Jakarta and Japan. He eventually merged his circus company with his cousin's company to form a new company called the Karlekar Grand Circus. The Karlekar Grand Circus lasted until 1935.

Pre independence period 
Inspired on Chiarini's circus at Kolkata, in 1887 Priyanath Bose from bengal founded the Great Bengal Circus and toured Bengal, India and South East Asia. 

On February 2, 1904, the Malabar Grand Circus, the first circus company in Kerala state was inaugurated at Chirakkara under the leadership of Pariyali Kannan, a student of Keeleri Kunjikannan. The company only operated for two years. 

Great Royal Circus was supposed to have started in 1909. Its previous name was Madhuskar's Circus, later an animal trainer Narayan Rao Walawalker took over the circus and renamed it as The Great Royal.

In the year 1920 Baburao Kadam founded the Grand Bombay Circus. 1922, Keeleri's nephew K.M.Kunhikannan started the Whiteway Circus. Later he found Hind Lion circus also. In 1947, these three circuses were merged to form Great Bombay Circus.

In 1924, another student of Keeleri, Kallan Gopalan, started the Great Rayman Circus.

A circus, named Vijaya Circus, having a two-pole tent, two lions, one elephant, and the other essential equipment was owned by R. V. Mamoo of Akola, Maharashtra. Mamoo sold it to M. V. Shankaran in 1951 for Rs. 5000. Shankaran renamed this circus as Gemini Circus. (See: Champad, Sreedharan. 2013. An Album of Indian Big Tops (History of Indian Circus), Houston: Strategic Book Publishing and Rights Co., p. 64 and 66).

History of circus academy in India 
In 1888, Chatre's Great Indian Circus toured Thalassery, Kannur, Kerala. It was in Thalassery that Chatre met Kalaripayattu (a type of traditional marshal art) and gymnastic trainer Keeleri Kunhikannan. An agreement was signed between Keeleri Kunhikannan and Chatre, according to that Keeleri Kunhikannan agreed to train the trainees for the circus and Chatre agreed to employ them. For this, Keeleri started a new circus school at Chirappuram near Thalassery, Kannur. The name of his institute was All India Circus Training Hall. In 1901, the Government of Kerala started a Circus Academy in Thalassery, Kannur. It was the first government circus academy in the country.

After Kunhikannan’s death in 1939, one of his student M. K. Raman started Keeleri Kunhikannan Teacher Memorial Circus & Gymnastic Training Centre in Chirakkara.

See also
Sreedharan Champad, author of An Album of Indian Big Tops: (History of Indian Circus)

References 

Circuses
History of India